Dave Berry (born David Holgate Grundy, 6 February 1941 in Woodhouse, Sheffield, England) is an English rock singer and former teen idol of the 1960s.

He performed a mixture of R&B, rock and pop ballads and was popular in Britain, and in Continental Europe, especially Belgium and the Netherlands, but had no commercial success in the US, where he is best known for the original versions of Ray Davies' "This Strange Effect" and Graham Gouldman's "I'm Going to Take You There".

He had an unusual ambition for a pop performer trying to make a name for himself - to appear on television completely hidden by a prop. In his own words, to "not appear, to stay behind something and not come out". He often hid behind the upturned collar of his leather jacket, or wrapped himself around, and effectively behind, the microphone lead.

Career
His best-remembered hits are "Memphis, Tennessee", "The Crying Game" (1964) and his 1965 hit "Little Things", a cover version of Bobby Goldsboro's Stateside Top 40 success. "This Strange Effect" (1965), written by Ray Davies, became a Number One hit for him in the Netherlands and Belgium, countries where he still enjoys celebrity status, having received an award from Radio Veronica, Netherlands, for their best selling pop single of all time. B. J. Thomas's sentimental "Mama" (1966) and  "Don't Gimme No Lip Child", the latter is the flip to Berry's No. 5 hit single, "The Crying Game", in 1964, and covered by the Sex Pistols, were other notable recordings.

His early hits name-checked his backing band the Cruisers who at that time were John Fleet (bass and piano), Roy Barber (rhythm guitar), Frank Miles (lead guitar) and Kenny Slade (drums). Berry parted with this line-up around the time of "The Crying Game" and recruited three more local musicians - Frank White, Johnny Riley and Pete Cliff as the second generation of Cruisers. Lead guitarist White was eventually replaced by Roy Ledger. Berry regularly used session musicians Jimmy Page, John Paul Jones, Big Jim Sullivan and Bobby Graham. Currently in the Cruisers are Daniel Martin (lead guitar since 2010), Adrian Fountain (rhythm guitar since late 2011), Dan Wright (drums, from January 2013) and Brian Wood (bass guitar, joined 24 years ago, the longest serving member of the band).

His stage act, which drew on the work of Elvis Presley and Gene Vincent, provided an inspiration for Alvin Stardust. The Geoff Stephens-penned song "The Crying Game" brought Berry's voice to his biggest international audience in 1992, when it was used as the theme song for the film The Crying Game. In the final quarter of 2010, "Little Things" was used in an advertisement campaign on British television by Andrex toilet paper. Berry also regained some recognition when he was the surprise hit of the annual Alexis Korner Tribute in 1995. In 1998 "This Strange Effect" was covered by the Belgian band, Hooverphonic, on their album, Blue Wonder Power Milk.

In May 2009, Berry toured the UK and appeared in a cameo role in a theatrical production, The Mod Crop. In August that year, RPM Records issued a double CD anthology of Berry's earliest recordings for Decca, entitled This Strange Effect (The Decca Sessions 1963–1966). The package added two previously unissued tracks made in 1963 (before Berry signed with Decca) with producer Mickie Most: "Easy To Cry" and "Tongue Twisting". Berry's illustrated autobiography, Dave Berry - All There Is To Know, was published in 2010 by Heron Publications Ltd. It included contributions from Joe Cocker, Ray Davies, Tony Iommi, Peter Stringfellow and Bill Wyman.
 
A double compilation, Picture Me Gone - The Decca Sessions 1966–1974, was released in January 2011.

Discography

See also
List of NME covers
List of performers on Top of the Pops
List of artists under the Decca Records label
British Invasion

References

External links

Official website

1941 births
Living people
English male singers
English pop singers
Musicians from Sheffield
Decca Records artists
British rhythm and blues boom musicians